Arnoglossum sulcatum, the Georgia Indian plantain, is a North American species of plants in the sunflower family. It is native to the southeastern United States in the states of Mississippi, Alabama, Georgia, and Florida.

Arnoglossum sulcatum is a large plant growing up to 140 cm (56 inches) tall. Flower heads are small but numerous, usually white or pale green, occasionally slightly purplish. The species grows in wet, shaded areas.

References

Senecioneae
Flora of the Southeastern United States
Plants described in 1902
Flora without expected TNC conservation status